JS Bank Limited (JSBL) is a Pakistani commercial bank headquartered in Karachi, Pakistan. The bank is a prominent majority-owned subsidiary of JS Group. The bank was established in April 2007 as a result of the merger of two mega corporates, Jahangir Siddiqui Investment Bank Limited and American Express Bank. JS Bank Limited currently operates branches across Pakistan as well as an international branch in Manama, Bahrain.

The Pakistan Credit Rating Agency Limited (PACRA) maintains the long-term entity rating of JS Bank Limited (JSBL) to ‘AA-(Double A Minus). Meanwhile, short-term entity rating is maintained at ‘A1+’ (A One Plus).

History
JS Bank origins began with the acquisition of Citicorp Investment Bank Limited by Jahangir Siddiqui & Co. Limited on the 1st of February 1999 to form Jahangir Siddiqui Investment Bank Limited (JSIBL). JSIBL had a 60% stake in Citicorp giving it ownership of the organization and its operations in Pakistan. In 2007, JSIBL and American Express Bank Limited - Pakistan operations were merged resulting in the formation of the JS Bank. Jahangir Siddiqui & Co. maintained majority shares in the new company.

The bank rapidly grew its network and reached the PKR 400 billion deposit mark by 2020.

JS Bank holds the largest share in the disbursement of the Rozgar Refinance Scheme amounting to PKR 10.8 billion as per State Bank of Pakistan policy.

Awards and honours
Best Environmental and Social Governance Bank - Pakistan Banking Awards 2017.
In 2019, JS Bank became the first Pakistani financial institution to gain this accreditation from the Green Climate Fund.
Certificate of Merit – Best Corporate Report Award 2019 by ICAP/ICMA.
Best Bank for SMEs, Best Bank for CSR - Asiamoney Awards 2020.
The bank won the Best Payment Technology/Solution Provider award for its Digital Traffic Challan Initiative at the 2019 DIGI Awards.
SME Bank of the Year 2019, 2020, 2021 - Asian Banking and Finance Awards.
JS Bank won the Asiamoney Awards 2020 for being ‘Best Bank for SMEs’ and ‘Best Bank for CSR.
On 20 July 2020, the bank was recognized by the State Bank of Pakistan (SBP) for its role in driving home remittance.
The bank has been further recognized by the State Bank of Pakistan as the best performer under the Rozgar Refinance Scheme, a concessional credit scheme for SME’s that ensure zero job layoffs during the Covid-19 worldwide Pandemic.

Products and Services
JS Bank products include personal banking including current accounts, savings accounts, mortgages, loans, lockers, credit cards, debit cards, and digital banking. Under the umbrella of business financing, the bank provides Corporate Banking, Commercial Banking, Investment Banking, Trade and SME solutions.

Retail Banking
The bank provides various current and savings accounts; JS Her Current & Savings Account are designed especially for women which provide them with a specialized suite of banking benefits, preferential pricing, and free micro-critical illness cover for female-specific diseases.

JS Bank has partnered with VISA for 24-hour cashback on purchases through JS Credit Cards.

SME Banking
JS Gold Finance is a personalized financing service that converts gold jewelry or assets into working capital for business or investment needs of up to PKR 25 Million.

JS Khud Mukhtar finances businesswomen of Pakistan to enable empowerment as well as financial stability amongst women.

Private Banking
JS Bank opened its Private Banking office at the Serena Business Centre in Islamabad in December 2021. This is the third office that has been inaugurated after Karachi and Lahore.

JS Private Banking facilitates priority customers with dedicated financial advisors who guide & assist in wealth management and estate planning among other things.

E-Banking
JS Bank follows a multi-channel platform approach, which includes JS Mobile and internet banking. Its offerings include JS Digi Cheque, the first of its kind digital cheque service in Pakistan which allows users of the Bank’s Mobile App to send e-cheques instantly.

Under the Roshan Digital Account program launched by State Bank of Pakistan, JS Bank allows Non-resident Pakistanis to open their Roshan Digital Accounts via WhatsApp, to provide convenience to the users.

The bank has launched an end-to-end digital account opening facility titled JS Blink which allows customers to open a complete checking account by either downloading JS Mobile or by visiting the JS Bank Website.

Zindigi, a digital banking application, powered by JS Bank was introduced with launch events in 13 cities across Pakistan. Available for both Android and iOS users, Zindigi is targeting millennials & Gen-Z, and showcases industry-first use cases like digital investments in stocks and mutual funds.

Penalty imposed by the State Bank of Pakistan
In September 2019, the State Bank of Pakistan imposed penalties on a number of local institutions including JS Bank for deficiencies in customer due diligence. The bank’s departments where discrepancies were pointed out included asset quality, corporate governance, and AML/KYC. The bank was also advised timelines to enhance its processes for identification of Politically Expose Persons, customer risk profiling and transaction monitoring.

References

External links
 Official Website

Pakistani companies established in 2006
Banks established in 2006
Banks of Pakistan
Companies listed on the Pakistan Stock Exchange
Companies based in Karachi
Companies of Sindh
Pakistani brands